The 1990–91 Alabama Crimson Tide men's basketball team represented the University of Alabama in the 1990-91 NCAA Division I men's basketball season. The team's head coach was Wimp Sanderson, who was in his eleventh season at Alabama. The team played their home games at Coleman Coliseum in Tuscaloosa, Alabama. They finished the season with a record of 23–10, 12–6 in conference, good for fourth place.

Forwards David Benoit and Keith Askins graduated and moved to the NBA, but the Tide was bolstered by freshman signee James "Hollywood" Robinson and junior college transfer Latrell Sprewell from Milwaukee, Wisconsin.

The Tide won the 1991 SEC men's basketball tournament, their third straight SEC tournament title, beating Tennessee in the final and earning a third consecutive automatic bid to the NCAA tournament.  The Tide also advanced all the way to the Sweet 16 for the second year in a row, defeating Murray State and Wake Forest before losing to Arkansas.

Roster

Schedule and results

|-
!colspan=9 style=|Non-conference Regular season

|-
!colspan=9 style=|SEC Regular season

|-
!colspan=9 style=| SEC Tournament

|-
!colspan=9 style=| NCAA Tournament

Rankings

References 

Alabama
Alabama Crimson Tide men's basketball seasons
Alabama Crimson Tide
Alabama Crimson Tide
Alabama